The Monster is an amusement ride manufactured by Eyerly Aircraft Company. The ride spins while moving up and down at a slow pace. Each car spins while giant arms move up and down in a circular motion. Riders may experience the feeling of weightlessness when going in the air and coming back down to ground level.

Design 
The Monster and the Spider are two different rides. The Spider is an offshoot of the Octopus, which has 8 arms with either one or two seats at the end, whereas the Spider has six arms with two seats at the end of each arm. The Monster has six arms similar to the Spider however it has four seats on the end with a rotating arms operated by electric motors where the seats are connected .

Existing rides 

 Monster- Cedar Point, originally opened in 1970 and was refurbished and relocated within the park for 2014. (Monster model)
 Monster- Dorney Park & Wildwater Kingdom, opened 1995 but, was removed for the addition of Dominator in 1998 but, was returned in 2000 to its current location. (Monster model)
 Monster – Essel World (Monster model)
 Monster- Kings Island, opened in 1972 but, originally operated at Coney Island (Cincinnati, Ohio) from 1969–1971. (Monster Model)
 Monster- Valleyfair, opened in 1977. (Monster model)
Spider- Elitch Gardens Theme Park, opened in 1969 at the original location of Elitch Gardens. Opened at the current location in 1995. (Spider model)
 Spider- Idlewild and Soak Zone (Spider model)
 Spider- Waldemeer & Water World (Spider model)

Now defunct 
 Bell's Amusement Park in Tulsa, Oklahoma had one known as the Spider. (Spider model)
 Blackpool Pleasure Beach The Monster! operated from 1968 to 1995. It was replaced by Ice Blast. (Monster model)
 California's Great America had one known as The Lobster where it operated at the park from 1976 until the early 1990s. It was located in the Yankee Harbor section of the park. (Monster model)
 Canada's Wonderland had one known as Shiva's Fury (later The Fury) that operated from 1981–2003. It was removed for the 2004 addition of Tomb Raider: The Ride (Renamed Time Warp in 2008). (Monster model)
 Carowinds The Witch Doctor (later renamed Black Widow) operated from 1973 to 1987. The Cinema 180 Theater replaced the ride in 1988. (Monster model)
 Frontier Village operated a Spider (named Tarantula) from 1975 until the park's closure in 1980.
 Geauga Lake had operated a Spider known as the Black Squid from 1970 until the park's closure in 2007. The Black Squid was relocated to Kings Dominion but was in too poor of condition to be reassembled.
 Hersheypark in Hershey, Pennsylvania purchased a Monster from Eyerly in January 1972, which was installed in the newly built Carrousel Circle for the 1972 season as part of Phase I of the park's redevelopment project. The ride was removed from operations after the 1983 season. (Monster model)
 Kennywood Monongahela Monster operated from 1979 to 1989. It was replaced by the Swing Around. (Monster model)
 Kings Dominion The Monster operated from 1975 to 1988. It was also known as The Bad Apple during its years of operation in the park. (Monster model)
 Lakemont Park, Altoona, Pennsylvania removed in 2010 due to rising maintenance costs. (Monster model)
 Lakeside Amusement Park The Spider operated until in was dismantled prior to the beginning of the 2017 season. (Spider model)
 Lakeside Amusement Park (Virginia) The Monster was operating at the park as of 1985. The park eventually closed at the end of the 1986 season. (Monster model)
Pontchartrain Beach, The Monster operated until the park closed in 1983. (Monster model)
Silverwood Theme Park, The Monster operated from 1988 until the end of the 2004 season. It was replaced with the Trabant in 2005. (Monster model)
 Six Flags AstroWorld, Houston, Texas Black Dragon operated from 1968 to 1977 in Oriental Village section of the park. (Monster model)
 Six Flags Magic Mountain Jolly Monster operated at the park from 1973 to 1981. (Monster model)
 Six Flags Over Georgia Mo-Mo The Monster operated from the early 1970s to the mid-late 1980s. (Monster model)
 Six Flags St. Louis Mo-Mo The Monster operated from 1973 to 1994. It was replaced by the Riverview Racer in 1996. (Monster model)
 Williams Grove Amusement Park had one known as The Monster. It is currently unknown as to when The Monster opened at the park but, it is known that The Monster closed and was sold when the park closed in 2005. (Monster model)
 Worlds of Fun in Kansas City, Missouri had one known as the Octopus. Last Season 2014. Removed due to unavailability of spare parts. (Monster model)

See also 
 Octopus (ride)

References

External links 
 Monster at Cedar Point

Amusement rides